The Central Committee of the Communist Party of Vietnam (Vietnamese: Ban Chấp hành Trung ương Đảng Cộng sản Việt Nam) is the highest decision-making body of the party between convocations of the National Congress.

History
The Central Committee was established on 3 February 1930 when the Communist Party of Indochina and the Communist Party of Annam merged. In between Central Committee plenary sessions the main decision-making bodies of the party are the Politburo and the Secretariat. The Central Committee has been led since its establishment in 1930 by the General Secretary of the Central Committee.

Terms

See also
 Central Committee subunits
 Politburo of the Communist Party of Vietnam
 Secretariat of the Communist Party of Vietnam
 General Secretary of the Communist Party of Vietnam
 List of central officeholders in the Communist Party of Vietnam

References

Bibliography
 

 
Vietnam, Communist Party
Politics of Vietnam